Didier Crettenand (born 24 February 1986) is a Swiss football midfielder.

Club career
Crettenand started his football career at Swiss Super League club Sion where he made 128 appearances, scoring 8 goals. During his time at Sion he played out on loan for two clubs, firstly FC Sion II (Sion's B-Team) and played in 50 matches while scoring 13 goals.

His secondary loan spell away from the Stade Tourbillon was to Swiss Challenge League side Lausanne-Sport, with whom he made 24 appearances and scored 1 goal. Crettenand joined Servette in 2013 where he stayed until February 2015 when he left by mutual consent to continue his career in North America with third-tier Orange County Blues.

Honours 
Sion
Swiss Cup: 2005–06, 2008–09, 2010–11

References

Weltfussball profile

1986 births
Living people
Swiss men's footballers
FC Lausanne-Sport players
FC Sion players
Servette FC players
Orange County SC players
Swiss Super League players
Swiss-French people
Association football midfielders
USL Championship players